Gopalapuram  is a village in Warangal district of the Indian state of Telangana. It is located in Hanmakonda mandal of Hanmakonda revenue division.

References

Cities and towns in Hanamkonda district
Villages in Warangal district